is a Japanese singer and songwriter. He is the lead singer of the Japanese "visual kei air band" Golden Bomber. He also writes, composes and co-arranges all the songs for the band. He plays multiple instruments including guitar, bass guitar and drums, and dabbles in piano and violin. He is the voice provider for the Cevio vocal synthesizer, KIRUNE.

Early life
Shō Kiryūin was born on 20 June 1984 in Tokyo, Japan. He attended Tokyo Metropolitan Mukogaoka High School, where he participated in the Light Music club.

Career

Golden Bomber
He formed the band Golden Bomber with guitarist Yutaka Kyan. Initially the members played live instruments, but due to Yutaka Kyan's lack of musical ability, they decided to switch to play their music from an iPod and restyle themselves as an "air band". He writes songs and lyrics by himself. However, he went to the recording studio with other members of Golden Bomber, Kiryūin plays instruments including violin. He touring live with Oneman Kowai, and Zenryoku Baka tours along with other members of Golden Bomber. In 2008 He and other members of Golden Bomber signed with Euclid/Zany Zap records, but signed with Atlantic Records. Kiryūin and members of Golden Bomber performed for 2 days at the Yokohama Arena, He performed in Nippon Budokan, and on 21 January, Kiryūin and members of Golden Bomber performed in Osaka-jō Hall, but in 2010, the Expo 2010 concert in Shanghai was cancelled.

Parodies 
Kiryūin makes many parody songs of songs by famous singers and bands, imitating their melody, lyrics, singing style. For example, "Ultra Phantom" is Koshi Inaba, "Tsunami no Johnny" - Keisuke Kuwata imitation.

Other ventures 
On June 20, 2012, Kiryūin released his autobiography "I’m Golden Bomber’s vocalist, are there any questions?". He made his solo debut with the opening theme "Life is SHOW TIME" from Kamen Rider Wizard.

Radio hosting 
Kiryuin hosts All Night Nippon radio program, from January 5, 2011 to June 29, 2015.

Personal life
Kiryūin lists his hobbies and interests as meat, bread, alcohol, ramen, manga, adult videos, detective games, and 1990s J-pop. Since middle school, he has been a big fan of Gackt and Malice Mizer.
Kiryuin Sho announced his marriage on September 4, 2021 asking fans to be respectful of his wife's privacy due to her uninvolvement with performing arts. He asked that people also not harass both extended families. The announcement was made directly by Kiryuin Sho on his personal Ameba blog and Twitter.

Discography

References

External links 
 
 Ameba (blog)
 Euclid Group Official

Japanese male singer-songwriters
Japanese singer-songwriters
Visual kei musicians
1984 births
Living people
21st-century Japanese singers
21st-century Japanese male singers